Dham is a 2003 Indian Telugu-language action film produced by Mohana Radha and Kishore Babu on Radaan Mediaworks banner, presented by Raadhika and directed by Raju Voopati. Starring Jagapati Babu, Sonia Agarwal and Neha Mehta, with music composed by Ramana Gogula.

Plot 
Rushi runs a yoga center, where he comes across four students who are best friends; Chaitanya, Prasanth, Santosh, and Vicky. Pooja, a female student, falls in love with Rushi. All of them become closer and become good friends with Rushi.

Meanwhile, Rushi learns that the four youngsters have had problematic love lives. Chaitanya is forcibly separated from his lover Radhika by her father Satya, Santosh is rejected by his lover Sarada a classical singer because he stammers and Prasanth is hated by his lover Priya because he pretended to be a sports champion. Rushi assists them to solve their problems and makes their love successful. In the process, they learn about Rushi's past.

Rushi was a hot-blooded, angry young man, who overreacted to small problems, he falls in love with Anjali, who hates violence, but unknowingly she is a daughter of a mafia don Neelakantam. Rushi and Neelakantam clashed and he created a misunderstanding between Rushi amd Anjali and made Rushi abandon his love. But the four couples show their gratitude by reuniting Rushi and Anjali.

Cast 

 Jagapati Babu as Rushi
 Sonia Agarwal as Pooja
 Neha Mehta as Anjali
 Nandamuri Chaitanya Krishna as Chaitanya
 Anil as Prasanth
 Ravitej as Santosh
 Vikram as Vicky
 Brahmanandam as Shankara Sastry
 Ali
 Venu Madhav as Uday Tarun
 Avinash as Neelakantam
 Chalapathi Rao as Rushi's father
 Satya Prakash as Satya
 Mallikarjuna Rao as Satya's assistant
 Suman Setty as Rushi's assistant
 Narsingh Yadav as Goon
 Kavitha as Rushi's mother
 Junior Relangi as Pooja's father
 Sony Raj as Priya
 Swapna Madhuri as Sarada
 Ooma as Radhika
 Radhika Varma as Meghana
 Pavala Shyamala as Prashanth's grandmother

Soundtrack 

Music composed by Ramana Gogula. Music released on Supreme Music Company.

Reception 
Mithun Verma of Fullhyd rated the film 1 star. Jeevi of Idlebrain rated it 2.75 out of 5.

References

External links 

 

2000s Telugu-language films
2003 films
Indian action films